The 1981 Central Michigan Chippewas football team represented Central Michigan University in the Mid-American Conference (MAC) during the 1981 NCAA Division I-A football season. In their fourth season under head coach Herb Deromedi, the Chippewas compiled a 7–4 record (7–2 against MAC opponents), finished in third place in the MAC standings, and outscored their opponents, 223 to 131. The team played its home games in Perry Shorts Stadium in Mount Pleasant, Michigan, with attendance of 104,310 in five home games.

The team's statistical leaders included quarterback Bob DeMarco with 1,159 passing yards, Reggie Mitchell with 1,068 rushing yards, and tight end Mike Hirn with 295 receiving yards. Mitchell received the team's most valuable player award. Six Central Michigan players (Hirn, Mitchell, offensive tackle Tony Vitale, defensive end Kurt Dobronski, linebacker Ray Bentley, and defensive back Bruce Brownie) received first-team All-MAC honors.

Schedule

Roster

References

Central Michigan
Central Michigan Chippewas football seasons
Central Michigan Chippewas football